The Precipice is a 1948 novel written by Hugh MacLennan. It won the Governor General's Award for English-language fiction at the 1948 Governor General's Awards. MacLennan partly based The Precipice on the ballet Pillar of Fire, whose cast included Nora Kaye and Antony Tudor.

References

Footnotes

Bibliography 

 
 

1948 Canadian novels
Novels by Hugh MacLennan
William Collins, Sons books